6th Infantry Brigade may refer to:

6th Infantry Brigade (Australia)
6th Infantry Brigade (Lebanon)
6th Infantry Brigade (New Zealand)
6th Infantry Brigade (United Kingdom)